When Doctors Disagree is a 1919 comedy film directed by Victor Schertzinger, written by Anna F. Briand, photographed by Percy Hilburn, and starring Mabel Normand. The movie was released by the Goldwyn Pictures Corporation with a running time of 50 minutes. A print of the film survives in the Cinémathèque Royale film archive.

Plot
As described in a film magazine, Violet Henny (Ridgeway), the village miser's haughty daughter, as Queen of the May will not admit Millie Martin (Normand), the ragged daughter of old man David Martin, to her May Pole party, Millie breaks up the party. The next day she accompanies her father on the train to a nearby town to pay off the mortgage. While on the train she falls in love with chubby John Turner (Hiers), a young man who believes that he has committed a murder and is fleeing disguised as his uncle, who is a noted surgeon. Millie feigns a serious illness and the supposed doctor recommends an immediate operation, hoping to get the young woman off the train at the next town. He succeeds, but is also detrained to assist in the operation. After numerous remarkable incidents at the small town hospital, the couple are revealed as engaged.

Cast
Mabel Normand as Millie Martin
Walter Hiers as John Turner
George Nichols as David Martin
Fritzi Ridgeway as Violet Henny
Alec B. Francis as Dr. Harris, Sr.
William Buckley as Dr. Harris, Jr.
James Gordon

References

External links

 
 When Doctors Disagree at Turner Classic Movies
When Doctors Disagree at Looking-for-Mabel

1919 films
1919 comedy films
1919 short films
Silent American comedy films
American silent short films
American black-and-white films
Films directed by Victor Schertzinger
American comedy short films
1910s American films